Collegium Carolinum is a research institute in Germany, which is focused on history and culture of the Czech Republic (and Slovakia as well).

Collegium Carolinum was established by the Bavarian State Government in 1956. Between 1980–2003 it was managed by Ferdinand Seibt. From 2003 it is managed by Martin Schulze Wessel.

References

Historical research institutes
Research institutes in Munich